Compounds are organized into the following lists:

 , compounds without a C–H bond

See also 

 
 
 
 

 
 
 
 
  can form compounds

External links 

Relevant links for chemical compounds are:

 The CAS Substance Databases
 Common Chemistry
 Chemfinder
 ChemSpider
 ChemIDplus a non-commercial source
 PubChem

 
Chemistry-related lists